The 1926 French Championships (now known as the French Open) was a tennis tournament that took place on outdoor Clay courts at the Croix-Catelan of the Racing Club de France in Paris, France. The tournament ran from 2 June until 14 June. It was the 31st staging of the French Championships and the second Grand Slam tournament of the year.

Suzanne Lenglen repeated her feat of winning every event she was eligible for, in her final year of competition before she turned professional; the tournament was also notable for being the first time American competitors won a title, Vincent Richards and Howard Kinsey in the men's doubles.

Finals

Men's singles

 Henri Cochet defeated  René Lacoste, 6–2, 6–4, 6–3

Women's singles

 Suzanne Lenglen defeated  Mary Browne, 6–1, 6–0

Men's doubles
 Vincent Richards /  Howard Kinsey defeated  Henri Cochet /  Jacques Brugnon, 6–4, 6–1, 4–6, 6–4

Women's doubles
 Suzanne Lenglen /  Julie Vlasto defeated  Evelyn Colyer /  Kitty McKane, 6–1, 6–1

Mixed doubles
 Suzanne Lenglen /  Jacques Brugnon defeated  Nanette le Besnerais /  Jean Borotra, 6–4, 6–3

References

External links
 French Open official website

French Championships (tennis) by year
French Championships
French Championships
June 1926 sports events
French